Phytocoris intricatus is a species of plant bugs belonging to the family Miridae, subfamily Mirinae. It can be found in Austria, the Baltic states, Belarus, Benelux, Czech Republic, France, Germany, Hungary, Liechtenstein, Poland, Russia, Switzerland, and Scandinavia.

References

Insects described in 1861
Hemiptera of Europe
Phytocoris